Czech Lion Award for Best Film Poster is award given to the Czech film with the best film poster.

Winners

External links

Czech Lion Awards
Awards established in 1998